is a fictional character from the manga YuYu Hakusho by Yoshihiro Togashi. A  reborn as the human  in modern life, is introduced as a thief who stole a supernatural mirror to save his dying mother from death. Although Kurama is initially portrayed as a villain, he becomes a supporting character to aid the protagonist Yusuke Urameshi in the next arc. Across his fights are revealed events from his past life as a demon, into which he becomes able to transform for a limited time. The character has also appeared in the anime adaptation, the two movies, and other related works.

Kurama was modeled after a friend that Togashi found interesting. Already during his introduction Togashi planned to have him become an ally to the main characters despite being a villain. As the next arcs, which primarily relieve on action, Kurama became a prominent fighter much to Togashi's pressure since he was not used to writing fighting series. He was voiced by Megumi Ogata in Japanese and Shigeru Nakahara in his demon persona. Several voice actors have voiced Kurama in English. The character was well received by the media often due to his sex appeal and prominent role in the series as a supporting character. Ogata's performance was also the subject of positive response despite early negative backlash by viewers of the anime.

Creation
Kurama was modeled after a friend that manga author Yoshihiro Togashi has. Togashi was impressed by such a person for claiming to be a French aristocrat even though he was Japanese. His name was rumored to be from Mount Kurama. However, Togashi denied it, claiming he applied the kanji to the sounds he chose "based on my senses". In his characterization, Togashi labeled him as "the typical "" archetype who is usually polite, but scary when he gets angry. The surname, Minamino, comes from the singer Youko Minamino.There were other surname candidates such as the Japanese celebrities whose first names are also Youko. Meanwhile, the name Kurama's name came to Togashi on the spur of the moment. Although Kurama and Hiei were introduced as enemies that the protagonist Yusuke Urameshi had to fight, Togashi planned from the beginning to turn Kurama into a supporting character afterwards. According to editors from the magazine, Kurama went on to become one of the most popular characters in the series, which Togashi intended due to the way he drew him. 

As the YuYu Hakusho transitioned from a comedy to a fighting series, Togashi expressed pressure when incorporating Kurama and Hiei as main characters. For the Four Holy Beasts story arc, Togashi made four enemies on impulse, but the only humans were Yusuke and Kuwabara. When it became clear that they were not strong enough to take on two demons each, Hiei and Kurama appeared on the scene, making their introductions as protagonists. There were also many instances where Togashi would create nearly entire manuscripts by himself, such as the battle between Kurama and Karasu. Mari Kitayama finds Kurama to be the easiest of the main characters to design due to his well-proportioned features.

Casting
Kurama was Megumi Ogata's first voice-acting role. She stated that while auditioning it was a requirement by the anime's production company that the character's voice sound like a 17-year-old male but also like that of a member of Takarazuka Revue, an all-female musical theatre group that portrays both men and women. Shigeru Nakahara takes over the role of Kurama for his demon form.

For the English adaptation, John Burgmeier voices Kurama in the TV series and first film from the Funimation dubs, Candice Moore in the TV Series from the Animax Asia dub, Chris Orbach for the second film in Central Park Media dub, and David Hayter in the first film from the Anime Works dub.

Kurama was also portrayed by Hiroki Suzuki and Jun Shison in the TV drama.

Appearances

In YuYu Hakusho
Fifteen years before the series began, Kurama is a demon who is badly injured and escapes and enteres an embryo in a pregnant human woman, becoming  at birth. Kurama comes to love his now-single human mother, and when she becomes gravely ill he cannot bear to leave her all alone and remains as Shuichi. Having teamed up with two other demons named Hiei and Goki to steal three treasures, Kurama becomes a target of the protagonist detective Yusuke Urameshi. Yusuke saves Kurama's life with both of them giving some of their lifeforces, therefore they both survive. In the anime, the mirror cancels the sacrifice due to Yusuke's kindness. 

He begins assisting Yusuke in defeating the entities known as the The Four Beasts in exchange for a reduced sentence for his crime. 
For associating with humans, Kurama and Hiei are invited to take part in the Dark Tournament on Yusuke and Kuwabara's team. During the Dark Tournament story arc, Kurama is able to temporarily revert to his original form; Fox Demon Kurama ("Yoko Kurama" in the English anime). As Demon Kurama, his powers are far greater and he is capable of creating demonic plants which possess various attributes and highly formidable powers. Following their victory against Toguro's team, Kurama becomes intrigued by a video that consists of mankind's crimes stolen by the rebellious Shinobu Sensui. After watching Yusuke's death by Sensui, Kurama's old demon powers awaken. He is invited to the Demon Plane to join his old partner Yomi and becomes his second in command. He takes part in the Demon Plane Unification Tournament, losing in the third round. At the end of the series, he is shown working at his stepfather's company.

In other media
Kurama appears as a supporting character in Yu Yu Hakusho: The Movie on a mission to rescue Koenma who was taken by the demons Koashura and Garuga. The second film, Yu Yu Hakusho the Movie: Poltergeist Report, Kurama battles the Netherworld's forces. Kurama faces one of Yakumo's servants who impersonates one of his deceased friends Kuronue. On finding out about the impersonation and that henchman had tried to pervert the friendship between him and Kuronue, an enraged Kurama summons a whole forest of sharp-edged bamboo which pierces the imposter and kills him. Kurama later assists Yusuke in his final battle against Yakumo, restoring order they destroyed in the process.

A spin-off was also written which shows the first meeting of Kurama and Hiei and how they become allies before the series' start. The character is also playable in multiple video games including Yu Yu Hakusho Makyō Tōitsusen, Yu Yu Hakusho: Dark Tournament and Yu Yu Hakusho: Tournament Tactics.

Reception

Kurama is a popular character with fans, coming in third and second place in the series' first two popularity polls. He came in second in the American Shonen Jump poll. In Animages Anime Grand Prix, he was ranked as the third most popular male anime character of 1993 and the most popular male character in both 1994 and 1995. His alternate demon form was ranked sixteenth in 1994. Demon Kurama additionally won About.com's "Best Supporting Character" in its 2005 Anime Award Show. Kurama was also ranked the third best male anime character of the 1990s by Newtype. In an "Anime! Anime!" poll, Kurama was rated as the most popular character voiced by Megumi Ogata. In Japanese website goo poll, Kurama was voted as the fourth most sexually appealing character in Shonen Jump. In another poll from Goo, Kurama was voted as the most beautiful of men with long hair. Manga author Masashi Kishimoto was mainly inspired to create the Naruto character with the same name, Kurama, based on Togashi's character.

Kurama and Hiei's popularity in the series led to demand to introduce their characters earlier in the anime. However, the fact that Kurama was voiced by woman rather than a man generated controversy in Japan when the series first aired. Director Noriyuki Abe said it must have been a lot of pressure on Ogata. However, as the anime went on, the actor's charms were brought out and more fans were born rather those who disliked it. Animerica's Justin Kovalsky found Kurama and the others as suitable supporting characters for a fighting anime. THEM Anime Reviews found Kurama appealing especially when interacting with Hiei. 

Comic Book Resources also enjoyed Kurama's characterization most notably when fighting in the Dark Tournament due to his darker side being exposed when becoming his past demon persona as well as his several styles of fighting. Anime News Network favorited Kurama's tactics in the early episodes of the Black Chapter arc for standing out as one of the most intelligent characters. Despite the Three Kings arc being panned for being the series' worst story arc, Anime News Network praised it for exploring more of Kurama's dark characterization. DVD Talk agreed for the bigger focus on Kurama's character that was briefly explored in previous arcs. Fandom Post liked the balance that both Kurama and Hiei's sidestories bring to Yusuke's in the final arc but felt they were overshadowed by Hiei's side as the series had not properly explored his backstory before.

References

General
Entire manga
Togashi, Yoshihiro.  [YuYu Hakusho] (in Japanese). 19 vols. Tokyo: Shueisha, 1991–1994.
Togashi, Yoshihiro. YuYu Hakusho. 19 vols. San Francisco: Viz Media, 2003–2010.

Individual volumes

Specific

YuYu Hakusho
Anime and manga characters who can move at superhuman speeds
Anime and manga characters with superhuman strength
Anime and manga sidekicks
Anthropomorphic foxes
Comics characters introduced in 1991
Fictional androgynes
Fictional blade and dart throwers
Fictional characters based on real people
Fictional characters with alter egos
Fictional characters with energy-manipulation abilities
Fictional characters with evocation or summoning abilities
Fictional characters with extrasensory perception
Fictional characters with plant abilities
Fictional characters with slowed ageing
Fictional characters with superhuman durability or invulnerability
Fictional high school students
Fictional Japanese people in anime and manga
Fictional male martial artists
Fictional professional thieves
Fictional whip users
Fictional yōkai
Male characters in anime and manga
Martial artist characters in anime and manga
Merged fictional characters
Teenage characters in anime and manga